Khaney is a village in Ghanche District in the Gilgit-Baltistan region of Pakistan. It is located en route to Gondogoro Trek, which joins the Hushey Valley with K2 via Concordia.

References

Populated places in Ghanche District
Baltistan